Lake Mary is a freshwater lake and the largest of the Mammoth Lakes in Mono County, California. Lake Mary has a campground on its northwest end and can be used for rainbow trout, brook, and brown trout fishing. The lake also features two marinas with motorboat and kayak rental.

The lake is accessible from the town of Mammoth Lakes via Lake Mary Road and is surrounded by the scenic Around Lake Mary Road. The unincorporated community of Lake Mary, California, is situated on the southeast shore of the lake.

References 

Mary
Mary
Mary